"2 Phones" is a song by American rapper Kevin Gates. It was released on November 5, 2015 as the third single from his debut studio album Islah. It peaked at number 17 on the Billboard Hot 100, making it Gates' first top 20 song and his highest-charting single to date.

Music video
The song's accompanying music video premiered on January 1, 2016 on Kevin Gates's YouTube account. It was directed by Jon J, who previously directed the music videos for Gates' "Kno One" and "Really Really".

Chart performance
"2 Phones" debuted at number 93 on the US Billboard Hot 100 for the chart dated January 23, 2016. It eventually reached its peak position at number 17 for the chart dated April 23, 2016. On January 25, 2019, the single was certified quadruple platinum for combined sales and streaming data of over four million units in the United States.

Charts

Weekly charts

Year-end charts

Certifications

References

External links

Kevin Gates songs
2015 songs
2015 singles
Atlantic Records singles
Songs written by Starrah